Chrysemys is a genus of turtles in the family Emydidae. They are found throughout most of North America.

Species
There are two extant species:

 Chrysemys dorsalis Agassiz, 1857 – Southern painted turtle
 Chrysemys picta Schneider, 1783) – Painted turtle

Fossil record
Several fossil species have been described, dating back to the Miocene.

Fossil species
Chrysemys corniculata

Chrysemys idahoensis (sometimes included in Trachemys or Pseudemys)

Chrysemys isoni

Chrisemys timidus (may belong to distinct genus)
Chrisemys williamsi (may belong to distinct genus)

References

 
Turtle genera
Cryozoa
Deirochelyinae
Turtles of North America
Miocene turtles
Neogene turtles
Miocene reptiles of North America
Neogene reptiles of North America
Extant Miocene first appearances
Langhian first appearances
Taxa named by John Edward Gray